Metropolitan Edison Building is a historic office building located at Reading, Berks County, Pennsylvania.  It was built in 1926–1927, and is a 12-story, "L"-shaped, steel frame building faced with Indiana limestone, brick, and terra cotta reflective of the Chicago style. It stands 150 feet tall. A five-story addition was completed in 1956.  The building measures 119 feet, 8 inches, by 169 feet, 6 inches.  It was the original home of the Metropolitan Edison Company, Gilbert-Commonwealth, and the CNA Insurance Company.

It was listed on the National Register of Historic Places in 1983.

References

Buildings and structures in Reading, Pennsylvania
Commercial buildings on the National Register of Historic Places in Pennsylvania
Office buildings completed in 1927
Office buildings completed in 1956
Chicago school architecture in Pennsylvania
FirstEnergy
National Register of Historic Places in Reading, Pennsylvania